Vieillard is a French surname. Notable people with the surname include:

Antoine Vieillard de Boismartin (1747–1815), French lawyer and playwright
Eugène Vieillard (1819–1896), French physician and botanist
Pierre-Ange Vieillard (1778–1862), French poet, playwright and literary critic

See also
Jean-Louis Vieillard-Baron (born 1944), French philosopher

French-language surnames